Vietnamese Braille is the braille alphabet used for the Vietnamese language. It is very close to French Braille (and thus to a lesser degree to English Braille), but with the addition of tone letters. Vietnamese Braille is known in Vietnamese as chữ nổi, literally "raised letters", while electronic braille displays are called màn hình chữ nổi.

Alphabet
However, because of the tone letters, the design is different: Vietnamese Braille has separate letters for vowels and tones, so the French Braille letters for é à è ù are not used; they are written instead as tone ◌́ or ◌̀ plus the vowels a e u.

 One braille letter is used for each Latin letter.
 Tone letters (transcribing the diacritics ◌̉ ◌́ ◌̀ ◌̃ ◌̣) are written immediately before the vowel.

For example,

Punctuation

See also
 Vietnamese sign languages

Notes

Vietnamese Braille